Mira Airport ( / Aerodrom Mira)  is an airport in Serbia, located in the vicinity of the city of Leskovac (about 2.5 km north from the center, near the road 158 that connects Leskovac–Niš). The airport is mainly used for pilot training and sport parachuting jumping.

Leskovac Airport is airport which is primarily used for sport, tourist and agronomic purposes although there are plans to expand the airport in the small cargo airport, and then the small airport passenger characters. At the airport there is an air-taxi service, which aims to carry passengers to any destination in any country and Europe.

External links 
Leskovac airport information (PDF)
Airport Leskovac
 Srbija će imati 16 malih aerodroma

Airports in Serbia
Leskovac